Nasty Love (released in the United States as  Troubling Love) is a 1995 Italian thriller film directed by Mario Martone. It was entered into the 1995 Cannes Film Festival. It is based on the novel of the same name,  by Elena Ferrante. The film was shot mainly in Naples, Italy.

Plot
Delia, a Neapolitan artist who has lived for many years in Bologna, returns to Naples after the sudden death of her mother, who apparently committed suicide by drowning. She doesn't believe the official verdict of suicide, convinced that her mother's exuberance, vivacity and existential positivity, which she remembers very well, would never have led her to do such a thing. She therefore begins to investigate her mother's recent past, given further impetus by disturbing phone calls received from an unknown interlocutor.

The fragmentary reconstruction of the last days of her mother's life bring to light remote events that Delia had hidden and buried in her memory, and force her to contemplate a reality different from what she had hitherto understood. Delia remembers and relives the moment when, under the influence of her oppressive father, she breaks her relationship with her mother, accused by her husband of a clandestine relationship with an unknown individual. But Delia is not ready to discover the truth about her mother, and therefore perhaps about herself, and just when the mystery about the last days preceding the supposed suicide is about to be clarified, she decides to return to Bologna, moving away forever from a painful past and from the hidden truth.

Cast
 Anna Bonaiuto as Delia
 Angela Luce as Amalia
 Gianni Cajafa as Uncle Filippo
 Peppe Lanzetta as Antonio
 Licia Maglietta as Young Amalia
 Anna Calato as Signora De Riso
 Italo Celoro as Delia's Father
 Carmela Pecoraro as Delia, as a child
 Giovanni Viglietti as Caserta
 Lina Polito as Rosaria, Delia's Sister
 Enzo De Caro as Caserta in Flashbacks
 Francesco Paolantoni as Uncle Filippo in Flashbacks
 Piero Tassitano as Legal Doctor
 Marita D'Elia as Wanda, Delia's Sister
 Sabina Cangiano as Shop Assistant
 Beniamino Femiano as Cloakroom Attendant

Awards
L'Amore Molesto won 3 David di Donatello Awards for Best Actress, Best Director and Best Supporting Actress and was nominated for 2 for Best Film and Best Producer. It was also nominated for a Palme D'or by the Cannes Film Festival for director Mario Martone. Anna Bonaiuto also won a Silver Ribbon under the category of Best Actress for her role as Delia.

References

External links

1995 films
1995 thriller films
1990s Italian-language films
Italian thriller films
Films directed by Mario Martone
Films set in Naples
1990s Italian films
Films based on works by Elena Ferrante